This is a list of works by Katherine Paterson (b. 1932).  This list includes her novels, picture books, short stories and non-fiction as well as film and television adaptations of her works.

Works

Novels
 The Sign of the Chrysanthemum, 1973.
 Of Nightingales That Weep, 1974.
 The Master Puppeteer, 1975.
 Bridge to Terabithia, 1977.
 The Great Gilly Hopkins, 1978.
 Jacob Have I Loved, 1980.
 Rebels of the Heavenly Kingdom, 1983.
 Come Sing, Jimmy Jo, 1985.
 Park's Quest, 1988.
 Lyddie, 1991.
 Flip-Flop Girl, 1994.
 Jip, His Story, 1996.
 Parzival: The Quest of the Grail Knight, 1998.
 Preacher’s Boy, 1999.
 The Same Stuff as Stars, 2002.
 Bread and Roses, Too, 2006.
 The Day of the Pelican, 2009.
 My Brigadista Year, 2017.

Picture books
 The Angel and the Donkey, 1996.
 The King's Equal, 1996.
 Celia and the Sweet, Sweet Water, 1998.
 The Tale of the Mandarin Ducks (Illustrated by Leo and Diane Dillon), 1990.
 The Wide-Awake Princess, 2000.
 Blueberries for the Queen, 2004.
 Brother Sun, Sister Moon: Saint Francis of Assisi's Canticle of the Creatures, 2011.

I-can-read books
 The Field of the Dogs, 2001.
 Marvin One Too Many, 2001.
 Marvin’s Best Christmas Present Ever, 1997.
 The Smallest Cow in the World, 1991.

Translations
Japanese
 The Crane Wife by Sumiko Yagawa, 1981.
 The Tongue-Cut Sparrow by Momoko Ishii, 1987.
Russian
 The Great Gilly Hopkins by Lur'e, 1982.
 Jacob have I Loved by Natalia Trauberg, 2001.
 Bridge to Terabithia by Natalia Trauberg, 2003.

Non-fiction
 Gates of Excellence: On Reading and Writing Books for Children, 1981.
 Consider the Lilies: Plants of the Bible, 1986.
 The Spying Heart: More Thoughts on Reading and Writing Books for Children, 1989.
 Who Am I?, 1992.
 A Sense of Wonder: On Reading and Writing Books for Children, 1995 (combined text of Gates of Excellence, and The Spying Heart)
 The Invisible Child: On Reading and Writing Books for Children, 2001.

Christmas short story collections
 Angels & Other Strangers: Family Christmas Stories, 1979.
 A Midnight Clear: Twelve Family Stories for the Christmas Season, 1995.
 Star of Night: Stories for Christmas, 1980.

Adaptations

Television productions
Bridge to Terabithia, PBS, 1985.
Miss Lettie and Me, TNT, 2002 (based on her short story "Poor Little Innocent Lamb").

Film adaptations
Bridge to Terabithia, Walt Disney Pictures, 2007.
The Great Gilly Hopkins, Lionsgate Films, 2016.

References

External links

Bibliographies by writer
Bibliographies of American writers
Children's literature bibliographies